La Cassorte is a mountain of the Swiss Pennine Alps, located west of Arolla in the canton of Valais. It lies on the range between the Lac des Dix and the Val d'Arolla, south of the Aiguilles Rouges d'Arolla.

References

External links
 La Cassorte on Hikr

Mountains of the Alps
Alpine three-thousanders
Mountains of Switzerland
Mountains of Valais